ACG Tauranga is a private coeducational day school located on the outskirts of Tauranga, New Zealand. The school is owned and operated by Auckland-based private education company ACG Schools (formerly known as Academic Colleges Group).

The school opened at the beginning of the 2015 school year, and initially offered places for Year 1-9 students. It now offers education from preschool-Year 13. It is the first private school in Tauranga since Tauranga Rudolf Steiner School integrated into the state system in March 2005. It is the latest of Academic Colleges Group's 10 schools, whose New Zealand schools are members of Independent Schools of New Zealand (ISNZ).
Thea Kilian is the current principal, transferring from her role as Deputy Principal from Auckland's Long Bay College.

Background
The school was announced via press release from ACG in August, 2013. It is ACG's first domestic school outside of the Auckland region. Of ACG's existing domestic schools, ACG Tauranga is closest in nature to ACG Strathallan in Papakura, south of Auckland, which opened in 2001.

The development was initially opposed by the Tauranga City Council, however work was underway in February 2014. The school covers 14 hectares, formerly a kiwifruit orchard. Amenities will include a gymnasium, three sports fields, a utility building, and parking. As well as hard courts, a sports pavilion, horticultural building and an Early Childhood Education centre.

The first public meeting was held in April 2014 at Trinity Wharf Hotel in Tauranga. ACG claims over 200 parents and teachers attended from across the Bay of Plenty.'

In 2016, construction of the new three-storey gymnasium began. It was completed in May 2017.

Curriculum
The curriculum is aligned closely to the Cambridge International programme.

As with all domestic ACG schools, ACG Tauranga offers the Cambridge International Examinations (CIE) instead of the National Certificate of Educational Achievement (NCEA). Its first cohort of Year 13 students achieved a 100% pass rate in all A Level subjects in 2019.

Schools
The school is divided into Junior (Year 1–6), Middle (Year 7-9) and Senior (Year 10-13) Schools. It also has a preschool.

See also
Bethlehem College
Aquinas College
ACG Strathallan

External links
 ACG Tauranga website
 Academic Colleges Group website

References

Private schools in New Zealand
Cambridge schools in New Zealand
Schools in the Bay of Plenty Region
Schools in Tauranga
Educational institutions established in 2015
2015 establishments in New Zealand